The 1941 North Dakota Fighting Sioux football team was an American football team that represented University of North Dakota in North Central Conference (NCC) during the 1941 college football season. In its 14th season under head coach Charles A. West, the team compiled a 4–5 record (3–1 against NCC opponents), tied for fourth place in the NCC, and was outscored  by a total of 145 to 110. The team played its home games at Memorial Stadium in Grand Forks, North Dakota.

End Al Simmons was selected by the college sports editors to the 1941 All-North Central Conference football team.

Schedule

References

North Dakota
North Dakota Fighting Hawks football seasons
North Dakota Fighting Sioux football